The Volkswagen Transporter LT is the largest light commercial panel van produced by Volkswagen (and subsequently Volkswagen Commercial Vehicles as of 1996) from 1975 to 2006, before being replaced by the Crafter. Two generations were produced.

1st generation Transporter LT (Typ 28/Typ 21)

History
Volkswagen introduced the Volkswagen Type 2 in 1950 and developed light commercial vehicle versions for German and European markets. The name "Kombi" (the name under which the Type 2 was sold in Brazil) established itself as a concept term to describe an entire light commercial vehicle segment. The automaker introduced the revised Volkswagen Type 2 (T2) in 1967. Commercial customers were shipping heavier and larger-volume freight. The Volkswagen Type 2 platform was also limited by its rear-mounted engine design. A total of 471,221 series 1 LTs were produced between 1975 and 1996.

Design
The new design specifications for a larger transporter as an additional series ranged from 2.8 tons gross vehicle weight to 3.5 tons. The layout was a conventional rear drive with the engine located above the front axle, in a forward control or 'cab over' design.

The new Volkswagen van was launched in 1975 in Berlin. The name given to Volkswagen's large transporter was as functional as the entire vehicle: it was just called LT, which is simply the abbreviation of Lasten-Transporter (that basically means heavy load transporter or cargo transporter).

The Transporter LT came in three gross vehicle weights, from 2.8 to 3.5 tons (LT 28, LT 31, LT 35), with two wheelbases, two roof options, and with bodywork options as a panel van, a compact, a platform vehicle, and a chassis cab combination.

The compact LT panel van (with a little over four and a half metres in length) offered an interior load length of over three metres and a load area of around 5.5 square metres.

Suspension/Axles
The LT was equipped with a front axle with independent front wheel suspension. Later options, such as the heavy LT 40 to LT 55, had a solid front axle to achieve increased load-carrying capacity as is common for light trucks.

Facelifts
The first facelift in 1983 changed mostly the interior, at the same time as the engine cover was changed and the turbo-diesel and inline-6 petrol engines were introduced. A redesigned dashboard was added and various other small things were changed. The undercarriage had an additional third wheelbase as an option for platform-type vehicles, at up to 4.6 metres in length.

Two years later, Volkswagen again increased the gross vehicle weight, with the 5.6 ton LT 55. It was available with a single-tyre rear axle, allowing for more space between rear wheel wells inside the cargo floor. An LT with four-wheel drive that could be enabled from within the cab was also available.

The next facelift in 1986 changed the round headlights to rectangular units, as well as other minor cosmetic retouches.

In Spring 1993, there was again a modest change in the look, with new grey-plastic elements introduced to the radiator grille and in the rear lighting section. The diesel engines were replaced with a more modern version of the same block. The DW (N/A diesel) was replaced by the ACT engine and the DV (turbo-diesel) engines were replaced by the intercooled ACL engine. Additionally, the engine cover was replaced with a new version, that had an opening in the front allowing to check the coolant without having to open the entire engine cover.

Campervan versions
A touring camper in its various bodywork and fitting options was also produced. The vehicle's width allowed the possibility of beds arranged crosswise. Various Volkswagen-endorsed Westfalia campervan models were available for the LT, including the Sven Hedin, and a later model, Florida. The LT was also used by Karmann who produced over 3,000 Karmann LT Distance Wide coachbuilt motorhomes.

Truck cabs
The "G Series" light truck was a joint venture between Volkswagen and MAN AG, with gross vehicle weights of between six and ten tons. It was built from 1979 until 1993.

Volkswagen's Brazilian plant at Resende has been constructing trucks with weights of between 7 and 35 tons. Even after the launch of the new Volkswagen Constellation in 2006, Volkswagen Commercial Vehicles has continued to manufacture vehicles incorporating cabs based on the first generation of the LT. The Volkswagen Titan has succeeded in winning the European Cup in the Super Truck Race. Its cab is similarly based on the first generation of the LT's cab.

Rebadging
In the late eighties, German-built Volkswagen LT and MAN-VW G were sold in Spain as Pegaso Ekus, while Brazilian-built units were marketed in the US as Peterbilt Midrangers.

4x4
A 4X4 version of the Transporter LT was also produced. Volkswagen had already prepared for this in 1983 with the cab facelift, which incorporated instrumentation lights for the front, centre, and rear differential locks.

Sülzer developed a 6-cylinder, primarily diesel-powered, 4x4 version of the long-wheelbase VW LT, of which 156 were built. These were either LT40 or LT45 (rated 4 or 4.5 tonne). Opposed to the normal LT40 & LT45, the 4x4s only had single wheels on the rear axle. The chassis is lifted, 26mm anti-roll bars are added to cope with body-roll and the axles are replaced. A propshaft driven, rod/shaft controlled transfer box was installed under the vehicle.

The transfer box was a New Process 208, which is propshaft-driven and cable-operated. The same transfer box can also be found in Chevrolet Blazers and Jeep Cherokees. The first six of the Sülzer vehicles are supposed to have had Dana axles. After that production was changed to use the Italian-built Clark-Hurth axles. All 4x4 LTs came as standard with rear and centre locking differentials, with optional front diff-lock also available (until it became standard fitment in 1991).

Due to the change of axles, the 4x4 LTs came with different wheels to the standard LTs. All 4x4 LTs have 6 stud tube type split-rims in 6.5J width. The standard tyre fitment on these wheels is 7.00x16 or 7.50x16.

In 1985 VW took over the production of the 4x4 LT and introduced the DW (2.4 inline-6 N/A diesel) and DV (2.4 inline-6 turbo-diesel) engines to the portfolio. They made another 1250 or so 4x4 LTs. The model portfolio covered only long-wheelbase vehicles. Tintop and hightop as LT40, pickup and double-cab as LT40 or LT45.

In 1991 the naturally aspirated diesel engine was dropped from the 4x4 program as it did not have enough power for the 4x4 drivetrain, with most 4x4 LTs being either the 90 bhp 6-cyl petrol or the 102 bhp 6-cyl D24T. From 1993 on, VW introduced the D24TIC with 95 bhp, but more torque, for the LT (and LT 4x4). At the same time the transfer box was upgraded to the New Process 241.

Steyr-Puch in Austria built the Noriker using VW LT underpinnings in competition with the Sülzer and VW LT 4x4s, but they only were produced in limited numbers.

De Vries also built three VW LT 4x4s on the same principle as Sülzer/VW, one of which was used in the Dakar Rally in 1983.

Out of 5 million Mk1 VW LTs built, only 1,250 featured four-wheel drive.

Typ codes
The Volkswagen "Typ codes" for the first generation LT were:
 Typ 28 — April 1975 to July 1991
 ''Typ 21 — August 1991 to December 1995
 Typ 29 — 4x4 1984 to 1989
The last first-generation LT was produced in 1996, which corresponds to a British 'P' registration plate. In 21 years, just under 500,000 vehicles were assembled.

Engines

The petrol engine was a modified Audi 100 VW EA831 2.0 L inline four-cylinder. In 1976 Volkswagen wanted to make a sports coupe and had Porsche design one for them using parts from the VW/Audi group bin with front engine and rear-wheel drive. They did not go with the design as the rest of the range was switching to front-wheel drive i.e. Golf/Polo/Jetta so VW came up with another design (the Scirocco). Porsche then decided to build it anyway in a collaboration with VW culminating in the Porsche 924 running with an VW EA831 Audi 2 L engine with Bosch K-Jetronic injection which is the same basic engine that was in the 2 L petrol LT at the time albeit with a carburetor and a vastly uprated Porsche designed cylinder head. It was rated at 55 kilowatts (75 PS; 74 bhp) and achieved higher torque at lower engine RPMs.

An inline four-cylinder diesel engine by Perkins was available. The 48 kilowatts (65 PS; 64 bhp) 2.7 L diesel was included in the LT range from 1976 onwards.

The Perkins engine was replaced in 1978 with a six-cylinder variant of the Volkswagen Golf diesel. The original 1.6 L four-cylinder engine became the D24 2.4 L six-cylinder, delivering . This engine was also used in a number of Volvo passenger cars.

In December 1982, an upgrade to the LT was introduced. In addition, the six-cylinder engine was now also available as a  petrol engine. All engines were now mounted with a clear offset alignment that allowed for a flatter engine compartment, which was shifted further to the rear for more space for a third seat in the cab.

Early DV/ACL engine valves are mechanically shimmed; later versions were hydraulically auto-adjusted. The ACL had bigger injectors and the addition of the intercooler. The main block and bottom end remained identical. The head/valve adjusters/injectors/intake manifold and the turbo had variants plus a different sump for the oil to be pumped to the turbo.

Axles
Turbodiesel axles are reinforced, have the transition to the cardan shaft further ahead, or a shorter shaft.
Axles for single tires cannot be installed in vehicles with twin tires and vice versa.
LT 1 4x4 axles are completely different and cannot be replaced by other LT axles.

A full list of code letter explanations is available on the German VW LT wiki.

2nd generation Transporter LT (Typ 2D)

History
In 1996, the joint venture of Volkswagen and Daimler's Mercedes-Benz Commercial introduced the second generation Transporter LT. The Volkswagen version shared the body shell with the new Mercedes-Benz Sprinter. However, the engine and transmission were Volkswagen Group sourced. This deal would continue in the Volkswagen Crafter, a successor to the Transporter LT.

The new design incorporated an engine mounted longitudinally beneath a short hood and with rear-wheel drive. The Transporter LT adopted what had become the standard style of construction for bigger transporters. It also included economical direct-injection diesel engines, easy access to the driver cab behind the front axle, and a wide space between the driver and passenger seat.

The range now went from 2.6 to 4.6 tons gross vehicle weight, and the enclosed options of the panel van and compact were available in three wheelbase options. Platform vehicles, crew cabs, and numerous undercarriage options completed the range. A special articulated version of the second generation Transporter LT, the XLT was available through special order.

Typ codes
The Volkswagen "Typ codes" for the second generation LT are:
 Typ'' 35 — May 1996 to July 2006

Engines
Engines included a naturally aspirated engine, as well as three Turbocharged Direct Injection (TDI) diesel engines. These were the inline-five-cylinder TDI used in the Volkswagen Eurovan (Type 2 T4).

The 2.8 L engine specifications:
  inline-four-cylinder, 93 mm bore, 103 mm stroke and three valves per cylinder
 rated output:  EEC @ 3500 rpm;  @ 1800 rpm
 Diesel common rail fuel system

The 2.5 L:
  inline-five-cylinder, 81 mm bore, 95.5 mm stroke, 19.5 compression ratio, and two valves per cylinder
 rated output:  EEC @ 3500 rpm;  @ 1900 rpm
 Diesel direct injection fuel system (Bosch VP37 belt-driven pump with two-stage nozzles)
 KKK K14 turbocharger

Replacement
Production ended in September 2006, with about 350,000 LT models produced over nine years. Plans for the third generation of the 'large transporter' from Volkswagen Commercial Vehicles were canceled and later that year, the Volkswagen Crafter was launched.

References

External links

 Information and photos of Westfalia-built LT campervans
 VW Australia official LT site.
 UK VW LT website.

LT
Vans
Minibuses
Pickup trucks
Cab over vehicles
Rear-wheel-drive vehicles
All-wheel-drive vehicles
Vehicles introduced in 1975
1970s cars
1980s cars
1990s cars
2000s cars